A huarizo is a cross between a male alpaca and a female llama. The most common hybrid between South American camelids, huarizo tend to be much smaller than llamas, with their fibre being longer. Huarizo are sterile in the wild, but recent genetic research conducted at the University of Minnesota Rochester suggests that it may be possible to preserve fertility with minimal genetic modification.

Other camelidae hybridizations
Camel hybrids
Cama, a hybrid with camel and llama.
Llamanaco, a cross between guanaco and llama has been reported in the wild in the Magallanes Region of Chile.

See also
Mule and Hinny – two equine cross-species between a horse and a donkey which are also unable to reproduce.

References

Camelid hybrids
Intergeneric hybrids